MacTalla Mor is a Celtic Roots Band that was formed in 2002 and is based near New York City. The band combines traditional Gaelic music and singing with modern music styles including, rock, blues, jazz, reggae and hip hop. MacTalla is made up entirely of members of the Ofgang family.

Since their inception MacTalla Mor has toured the United States and Canada. They have played at  Caesar's Palace Las Vegas, Grandfather Mountain Highland Games, for ESPN, ABC and NBC TV and at Pete Seeger's Clearwater Festival.

The band has released four CDs. The CD "The New Colossus" released in 2008, was recorded in at A-Pawling Studio in Pawling New York in 2007. The CD's title track The New Colossus is based on a sonnet of the same name by Emma Lazarus the final lines of which were engraved on a bronze plaque in the pedestal of the Statue of Liberty in 1912.

Instrumentation 
Jesse Mo' Ofgang- Guitar, Vocals
Levon Ofgang- Guitar, Vocals
Ilana Regina Ofgang- Piano, Vocals
Patty Devlin Ofgang- Bodhran, Vocals
Erik "MageErik" Ofgang - Bass, Vocals

Discography 
Piping Hot 2005
No Man's Land 2006
Jacob's Ladder 2007
The New Colossus 2008

References

External links 
 official website
 Celtic Radio
 Pete Seeger's Clearwater Festival
 Celtic MP3 Review

American folk musical groups